Abbey Abraham Altson (1866–1948) was a British artist known for his Romanticism female portraits & Genre paintings.

Biography 
Abbey or Aby (Abe) Altson was born in England, the only child of Ethel (née Hatrick) and David Alston and travelled to Australia in the early 1880s. He joined the bohemian Buonarotti Club (1883-87) as one of its youngest members and received encouragement from senior artists. He studied at the National Gallery School 1885-90 and in 1890 he was awarded its Travelling Scholarship. Altson's winning painting was named Flood Sufferings and gained attention through its connection to the recent flood disaster of Bourke and other towns on the Darling River. He went to Paris the following year and spent the rest of his life overseas, often traveling between England and Iindia, and migrating to the US in 1939.

Altson along with Rupert Bunny & Max Meldrum studied at the Académie Julian, Paris under Jean Paul Laurens who was highly respected teacher. He also exhibited at the Allied Artists Association in London in 1908.  Australian exhibitors in 1908 exhibition included Altson, George Bell, Rupert Bunny & Thea Proctor.

Career 
Altson was a successful painter who after winning the 1890 National Gallery of Victoria Travelling Scholarship, moved to London.  The winners of the scholarship were required to paint 2 copies of old masters and one original. Altson chose to copy 2 portraits, Van Dyck's Portrait of a Lady of Rank with her daughter from the Louvre, followed by Rembrandt's An Old Man from London's National Gallery.  Altson exhibited in Société des Artistes Français in 1892, 1893 & 1896.

Legacy 
Alston's work featured in the National Gallery of Victoria traveling exhibition Golden Summers, 30 October 1985–27 January 1986.

Works 
 Flood Sufferings (1890)
 Meditation (1896)
 The Golden Age (1893)
 Inspiration (1899)
 Idyll of the Sea (1896 )
 Songs of the Forest

References

External links
 Artwork by Abbey Altson

1866 births
1948 deaths
People from Middlesbrough
19th-century Australian artists